Borghild Anker (1876–1955), was a Norwegian court official.  

She served as the overhoffmesterinne of the Royal Court of Norway. 

She was married to Peter Martin Anker

References

1876 births
1955 deaths
Norwegian ladies-in-waiting
Mistresses of the Robes (Norway)